Obervisse is a commune in the Moselle department in Grand Est in north-eastern France. The similarly named commune Niedervisse lies 2 km to the northwest.

See also
 Communes of the Moselle department

References

External links
 

Communes of Moselle (department)